The Timor Plate is a microplate in southeast Asia carrying the island of Timor and surrounding islands. The Australian Plate is subducting under the southern edge of the plate, while a small divergent boundary is located on the eastern edge. Another convergent boundary exists with the Banda Sea Plate to the north, and to the west is a transform boundary.

See also

References

Tectonic plates
Geology of Indonesia
Geology of the Pacific Ocean